Harold Thomsett (23 October 1913 – 12 April 1991) was an Australian cricketer. He played in two first-class matches for Queensland in 1935/36.

See also
 List of Queensland first-class cricketers

References

External links
 

1913 births
1991 deaths
Australian cricketers
Queensland cricketers
Cricketers from Queensland